This is a list of words of Korean origin which have entered into English usage.

General

Culture and martial arts

Food

Clothing

Ideology and religion

Other

See also  
Lists of English loanwords by country or language of origin

References

English words
 
Korean